Pedro Emanuel de Sousa Albino (born 21 December 1998) is a Portuguese footballer who plays for União de Leiria as a defender.

Football career
On 8 May 2016, Albino made his professional debut with Olhanense in a 2015–16 Segunda Liga match against Leixões.

On 28 December 2022, Albino signed with União de Leiria until the end of the season, with an option to extend.

References

External links

Stats and profile at LPFP 

1998 births
People from Olhão
Sportspeople from Faro District
Living people
Portuguese footballers
Association football defenders
S.C. Olhanense players
Amora F.C. players
S.C. Farense players
U.D. Leiria players
Liga Portugal 2 players
Campeonato de Portugal (league) players